The following is a list of rivers in Wyoming, United States.

East of the continental divide

Missouri River watershed
 Gallatin River
 Madison River
 Firehole River
 Gibbon River
 Yellowstone River
 Gardner River
 Lamar River
 Slough Creek
 Clarks Fork of the Yellowstone River
 Wind River/Bighorn River
 Little Bighorn River
Little Wind River
North Fork Popo Agie River
Middle Fork Popo Agie River
Little Popo Agie River
Roaring Fork Creek
Shoshone River
Greybull River
Shoshone River
Gooseberry Creek (Wind River/Bighorn River)
Owl Creek
Muddy Creek
Nowood River
Tensleep Creek
Paint Rock Creek
 Tongue River
 Big Goose Creek (near Sheridan)
 Little Goose Creek (near Sheridan) 
 Little Tongue River (Dayton)
 Powder River
 Clear Creek
 Rock Creek
 Little Missouri River
 Cheyenne River
 Belle Fourche River
 Niobrara River
 North Platte River
Encampment River
Medicine Bow River
Rock Creek
Little Medicine Bow River
 Sweetwater River
 Laramie River
Little Laramie River
North Fork Little Laramie River
Libby Creek
Middle Fork Little Laramie River
South Fork Little Laramie River
 North Laramie River
 Chugwater Creek

South Platte River watershed
 Crow Creek
 Lodgepole Creek

West of the continental divide

Colorado River watershed
 Green River
 Big Sandy River
 Blacks Fork
 Smiths Fork
 Hams Fork
 Yampa River
 Little Snake River
Roaring Fork Little Snake River
North Fork Little Snake River
New Fork River

Columbia River watershed
 Snake River
Henrys Fork (ID)
Fall River
Salt River
Swift Creek
Cottonwood Creek
Greys River
Little Greys River
 Hoback River
 Granite Creek
 South Fork Hoback River
 Gros Ventre River
 Lewis River
 Heart River
 Wolverine Creek
 Plateau Creek

Great Salt Lake watershed
Bear River (Great Salt Lake)

Alphabetically
Bear River (Great Salt Lake)
Belle Fourche River
Big Goose Creek (near Sheridan)
Big Sandy River
Bighorn River
Blacks Fork
Cheyenne River
Chugwater Creek
Clarks Fork of the Yellowstone River
Clear Creek
Cottonwood Creek
Crow Creek
Dead Indian Creek
Encampment River
Fall River
Firehole River
Gallatin River
Gardner River
Gibbon River
Gooseberry Creek
Granite Creek
Green River
Greybull River
Greys River
Gros Ventre River
Hams Fork
Heart River
Henrys Fork
Hoback River
Lamar River
Laramie River
Lewis River
Libby Creek
Little Bighorn River
Little Goose Creek (near Sheridan) 
Little Greys River
Little Laramie River
Little Medicine Bow River
Little Missouri River
Little Snake River
Little Tongue River (near Dayton)
Little Wind River
Lodgepole Creek
Madison River
Medicine Bow River
Middle Fork Little Laramie River
Middle Fork Little Snake River
Middle Fork Popo Agie River
Muddy Creek
New Fork River
Niobrara River
North Fork Little Laramie River
North Fork Little Snake River
North Fork Popo Agie River
North Laramie River
North Platte River
Nowood River
Owl Creek
Paint Rock Creek
Plateau Creek
Powder River
Roaring Fork Creek
Roaring Fork Little Snake River
Rock Creek (Clear Creek)
Rock Creek (Medicine Bow River tributary)
Salt River
Shell Creek
Shoshone River
Slough Creek
Smiths Fork
Snake River
South Fork Hoback River
South Fork Little Laramie River
South Platte River
Sweetwater River
Swift Creek
Tensleep Creek
Tongue River
Wind River
Wolverine Creek
Yellowstone River

See also
List of rivers in the United States

External links

Wyoming rivers
 
Rivers